The 1962 Paris–Nice was the 20th edition of the Paris–Nice cycle race and was held from 9 March to 17 March 1962. The race started in Paris and finished in Nice. The race was won by Jef Planckaert of the Flandria team.

General classification

References

1962
1962 in road cycling
1962 in French sport
March 1962 sports events in Europe